Ectoedemia crypsixantha is a moth of the family Nepticulidae. It was described by Edward Meyrick in 1918. It is known from South Africa (it was described from Pretoria).

References

Endemic moths of South Africa
Nepticulidae
Moths of Africa
Moths described in 1918